The British Overseas Territories maintain their own entry requirements different from the visa policy of the United Kingdom. As a general rule, British citizens do not have automatic right of abode in these territories.

Akrotiri and Dhekelia

The visa policy of Akrotiri and Dhekelia is the same as for Cyprus, which follows the visa policy of the Schengen Area. However, stays longer than 28 days per 12-month period require a permit. The territory has open borders with Cyprus, but controls entry from Northern Cyprus.

Anguilla

 – A maximum visa-free stay of 3 months is granted to nationals of all European Union countries, Andorra, Antigua and Barbuda, Argentina, Australia, Bahamas, Barbados, Belize, Botswana, Brazil, Brunei, Canada, Chile, Costa Rica, Dominica, East Timor, El Salvador, Grenada, Guatemala, Honduras, Hong Kong, Iceland, Israel, Japan, Kiribati, Liechtenstein, Macau, Malaysia, Maldives, Marshall Islands, Mauritius, Mexico, Micronesia, Monaco, Namibia, Nauru, New Zealand, Nicaragua, Norway, Palau, Panama, Papua New Guinea, Paraguay, Saint Kitts and Nevis, Saint Lucia, Saint Vincent and the Grenadines, Samoa, San Marino, Seychelles, Singapore, Solomon Islands, South Korea, Switzerland, Taiwan, Tonga, Trinidad and Tobago, Tuvalu, United Kingdom, United States, Uruguay, Vanuatu and Western Sahara.

In addition, holders of a valid visa or residence permit for the United Kingdom, United States or Canada do not need a visa for Anguilla.

From January 2021, other travellers may apply online for an electronic visa.

Statistics
Most visitors arriving in Anguilla were from the following countries:

Bermuda

 – Visitors are granted entry for a stay of up to 90 days. They may apply for an extension of stay up to 6 months.

Since 1 March 2014, Bermuda does not issue its own visas. However, it requires that visitors who need a multiple-entry visa to transit the United Kingdom, the United States or Canada (the only countries with scheduled flights from Bermuda) present this visa upon arrival in Bermuda. For visitors who need such visa, both the passport and the visa must be valid for at least 45 days beyond the end of their intended stay.

Bermuda does not require nationals of the following countries and territories to present a visa, regardless of the country of transit: all European Union countries, Andorra, Antigua and Barbuda, Argentina, Australia, Bahamas, Barbados, Belize, Benin, Bhutan, Botswana, Brazil, Brunei, Burkina Faso, Canada, Cape Verde, Central African Republic, Chad, Chile, Comoros, Costa Rica, Dominica, East Timor, El Salvador, Equatorial Guinea, Fiji, Gabon, Grenada, Guatemala, Guyana, Honduras, Hong Kong, Iceland, Indonesia, Israel, Japan, Kiribati, Laos, Liechtenstein, Madagascar, Malaysia, Maldives, Mali, Marshall Islands, Mauritania, Mauritius, Mexico, Micronesia, Monaco, Mozambique, Namibia, Nauru, New Zealand, Nicaragua, Niger, Norway, Palau, Papua New Guinea, Paraguay, Peru, Saint Kitts and Nevis, Saint Lucia, Saint Vincent and the Grenadines, Samoa, San Marino, São Tomé and Príncipe, Seychelles, Singapore, Solomon Islands, South Korea, Suriname, Switzerland, Taiwan, Thailand, Togo, Tonga, Trinidad and Tobago, Tuvalu, United Kingdom, United States, Uruguay, Vanuatu, Vatican City and Zambia.

Nationals of the following additional countries and territories do not need a visa to transit the United Kingdom: Armenia, Azerbaijan, Bahrain, Bolivia, Bosnia and Herzegovina, Cambodia, Colombia, Cuba, Djibouti, Dominican Republic, Ecuador, Georgia, Haiti, Jordan, Kazakhstan, Kuwait, Kyrgyzstan, Macau, Montenegro, Morocco, North Korea, Oman, Panama, Philippines, Qatar, Russia, Saudi Arabia, Tajikistan, Tunisia, Turkmenistan, Ukraine, United Arab Emirates and Uzbekistan; and nationals of Venezuela with a biometric passport.

Statistics
Most visitors arriving in Bermuda (including arrivals by air, cruise and yacht) were from the following countries:

British Antarctic Territory
 – The territory is administered in London by staff in the Polar Regions Department of the Foreign and Commonwealth Office which issues permits to those travelling to the territory. New applications should be filed at least 4 months in advance. Organisers need to demonstrate that they are sufficiently prepared for a visit to Antarctica.

British Indian Ocean Territory
 – Visitors must obtain a valid permit before travelling. Permits are issued by British Indian Ocean Territory Administration at the Foreign and Commonwealth Office in London. Any permit issued is valid for the outer islands only while the access to Diego Garcia is restricted to those with connections to the military facility. No unauthorised vessel is permitted to approach the Diego Garcia within 3 nautical miles and vessels in transit, on innocent passage as defined under maritime law, should maintain their course away from Diego Garcia. Proof of travel insurance and yacht insurance is required. Passports must be valid for 6 months. Any person who enters BIOT without a permit is liable to imprisonment for 3 years and/or a fine of £3000.

British Virgin Islands

 – Visitors are usually granted a one-month entry stamp on arrival, and may request an extension of stay up to 6 months.

A visa-free stay is granted to nationals of all European Union countries, Andorra, Antigua and Barbuda, Argentina, Australia, Bahamas, Bangladesh, Barbados, Belize, Bolivia, Botswana, Brazil, Brunei, Canada, Chile, China, Costa Rica, Dominica, East Timor, Ecuador, El Salvador, Eswatini, Fiji, Gambia, Ghana, Grenada, Guatemala, Honduras, Hong Kong, Iceland, India, Japan, Kenya, Kiribati, Lesotho, Liechtenstein, Macau, Malawi, Malaysia, Maldives, Marshall Islands, Mauritius, Mexico, Micronesia, Monaco, Namibia, Nauru, New Zealand, Nicaragua, Norway, Palau, Panama, Papua New Guinea, Paraguay, Saint Kitts and Nevis, Saint Lucia, Saint Vincent and the Grenadines, Samoa, San Marino, Seychelles, Sierra Leone, Singapore, Solomon Islands, South Africa, South Korea, Sri Lanka, Switzerland, Taiwan, Tanzania, Tonga, Trinidad and Tobago, Tunisia, Tuvalu, Uganda, United Kingdom, United States, Uruguay, Vanuatu, Vatican City, Venezuela, Zambia and Zimbabwe.

In addition, holders of a visa for the United Kingdom, United States or Canada do not need a visa for the British Virgin Islands. The visa for those countries must have at least 6 months of validity before travel.

Cayman Islands

 – A maximum visa-free stay of 6 months, for tourist purposes only, is granted to nationals of all European Union countries, Andorra, Antigua and Barbuda, Argentina, Australia, Bahamas, Bahrain,  Barbados, Belize, Botswana, Brazil, Brunei, Canada, Chile, Costa Rica, Dominica, Ecuador, Eswatini, Fiji, Grenada, Guyana, Hong Kong, Iceland, Israel, Japan, Kenya, Kiribati, Kuwait, Lesotho, Liechtenstein, Malawi, Malaysia, Maldives, Mauritius, Mexico, Monaco, Mozambique, Namibia, Nauru, New Zealand, Norway, Oman, Panama, Papua New Guinea, Peru, Saint Kitts and Nevis, Saint Lucia, Saint Vincent and the Grenadines, Samoa, San Marino, Seychelles, Singapore, Solomon Islands, South Africa, Switzerland, Taiwan, Tanzania, Tonga, Trinidad and Tobago, Tuvalu, United Kingdom, United States, Vanuatu, Venezuela and Zambia; and nationals of Jamaica under 15 or over 70 years of age.

A maximum visa-free stay of 30 days is also granted to permanent residents of the United States when arriving directly from the United States, of Canada when arriving directly from Canada or the United States, or of the United Kingdom when arriving directly from the United Kingdom.

Nationals of China, India and Jamaica who hold a valid visa issued by the United States, Canada or the United Kingdom can visit the Cayman Islands for up to 30 days only if arriving directly from the country that issued the visa.

Passengers can stay in transit for 24 hours without a visa except for nationals of Afghanistan, Albania, Algeria, Angola, Bangladesh, Belarus, Burundi, Cameroon, China, Colombia, Congo, Democratic Republic of the Congo, Eritrea, Ethiopia, Gambia, Ghana, India, Iran, Iraq, Ivory Coast, Lebanon, Liberia, Moldova, Montenegro, Myanmar, Nepal, Nigeria, North Macedonia, Northern Cyprus, Pakistan, Palestine, Rwanda, Saudi Arabia, Senegal, Serbia, Sierra Leone, Somalia, Sri Lanka, Sudan, Syria, Turkey, Uganda, Vietnam and Zimbabwe.

Statistics
Most visitors arriving in the Cayman Islands by air were from the following countries:

Falkland Islands 

 – The territory maintains its own entry requirements different from the visa policy of the United Kingdom. The Customs and Immigration Department of the Falkland Islands controls entry into the territory.

Visa exemption

Cruise ship visitors regardless of nationality do not need a visa to enter the Falkland Islands or to participate in shore excursions for up to seven days. However, visitors arriving by air or intending to spend time in the Falkland Islands before or after a cruise need a visa if not otherwise exempt.
 
Land-base visitors are required to have evidence of accommodation and funds for the duration of their stay, a return ticket, and travel insurance including medical evacuation should it be required.

Nationals of the following countries and territories holding a valid passport can enter the Falkland Islands without a visa for a period of 30 days and are issued a visitor's permit on arrival:

In addition, holders of international travel documents issued by the International Committee of the Red Cross and holders of a United Nations laissez-passer issued by the United Nations do not need a visa. All visa-exempt visitors may extend their visit up to a maximum of 12 months by applying directly to Customs and Immigration in Stanley.

Visa types
 
Visitor's permit: Nationals of countries not listed as visa-exempt need to obtain a visitor's permit prior to arrival in the Falklands. Visitor's visas must be obtained from a British embassy or consulate.
Work permit: A work permit must be applied from outside of the Falkland Islands initially. It grants permission for the holder to enter, depart and reside in the Falklands during the period of its validity, and to take employment with a specified employer or on one's own account engage in any trade, business or vocation stated in the permit. Maximum validity is 2 years but it can be renewed on application.
Temporary residence permit: A residence permit, which needs to be applied from outside of the Falkland Islands, grants permission for the holder to enter, depart and reside in the Falklands during the period of its validity up to a maximum of 3 years, but it can be renewed on application. The holder of a residence permit and any dependents included in the permit are entitled to apply for work permits if they wish to subsequently take up an employment opportunity.
Permanent residence permit: A permanent residence permit grants indefinite leave for the holder to enter, depart and reside in the Falkland Islands and to take any lawful employment or pursue any lawful business, trade, profession, or vocation in the Falkland Islands without needing a work permit. Where an application for a permanent residence permit is approved, any dependents included in the application of a principal applicant are also granted a permanent residence permit in their own right. The annual number of permanent residence permits that may be granted is controlled by a quota system.

Transit
 
All travellers who would normally require a visa to enter the Falkland Islands but are transiting by air or sea for less than 24 hours are exempted from the visa requirement.

Gibraltar 

 – Follows mainly the visa policy of the United Kingdom. A visa-free stay is granted to nationals of all European Union countries, Andorra, Antigua and Barbuda, Argentina, Australia, Bahamas, Barbados, Belize, Botswana, Brazil, Brunei, Canada, Chile, Costa Rica, Dominica, East Timor, Grenada, Guatemala, Honduras, Hong Kong, Iceland, Israel, Japan, Kiribati, Liechtenstein, Macau, Malaysia, Maldives, Marshall Islands, Mauritius, Mexico, Micronesia, Monaco, Namibia, Nauru, New Zealand, Nicaragua, Norway, Palau, Panama, Papua New Guinea, Paraguay, Saint Kitts and Nevis, Saint Lucia, Saint Vincent and the Grenadines, Samoa, San Marino, Seychelles, Singapore, Solomon Islands, South Korea, Switzerland, Taiwan, Tonga, Trinidad and Tobago, Tuvalu, United Kingdom, United States, Uruguay, Vanuatu, Vatican City and Western Sahara.

Additional visa exemptions:
 Holders of a UK multiple-entry visa issued for at least 6 months, a UK residence permit issued for at least 12 months, a UK biometric residence permit, or an EU family permit
 Holders of an indefinite leave to remain or a certificate of entitlement to the right of abode in the United Kingdom who have not been absent from the UK for more than 2 years
 Nationals of China, India, Mongolia and Morocco holding a Schengen multiple-entry visa, and nationals of Ukraine during their visa-free stay in the Schengen Area or holding an EU residence card, for a stay of up to 21 days or up to the visa or visa-free expiration date minus 7 days if earlier
 Holders of diplomatic, service or public affairs passports of China, of diplomatic or special passports of Bahrain, Kuwait, Oman, Qatar and the United Arab Emirates, and of diplomatic passports of Indonesia, Vietnam, South Africa and Turkey

On 31 December 2020, the European Union, Spain, the United Kingdom and Gibraltar agreed in principle to make Gibraltar part of the Schengen Area. If a treaty to this effect is concluded, the visa policy of the Schengen Area would apply to Gibraltar.

Montserrat

 – A visa-free stay of 6 months is granted to nationals of all European Union countries (except Croatia), Andorra, Antigua and Barbuda, Argentina, Australia, Bahamas, Bangladesh, Barbados, Belize, Botswana, Brazil, Brunei, Cameroon, Canada, Chile, Costa Rica, Dominica, Dominican Republic, East Timor, Eswatini, Fiji, Gambia, Ghana, Grenada, Guatemala, Guyana, Haiti, Honduras, Hong Kong, Iceland, India, Israel, Jamaica, Japan, Kenya, Kiribati, Lesotho, Liechtenstein, Macau, Malawi, Malaysia, Maldives, Marshall Islands, Mauritius, Mexico, Micronesia, Monaco, Myanmar, Namibia, Nauru, New Zealand, Nicaragua, Nigeria, Norway, Pakistan, Palau, Panama, Papua New Guinea, Paraguay, Rwanda, Saint Kitts and Nevis, Saint Lucia, Saint Vincent and the Grenadines, Samoa, San Marino, Seychelles, Sierra Leone, Singapore, Solomon Islands, South Africa, South Korea, Sri Lanka, Suriname, Switzerland, Taiwan, Tanzania, Tonga, Trinidad and Tobago, Tuvalu, Uganda, United Kingdom, United States, Uruguay, Vanuatu, Vatican City, Western Sahara, Zambia and Zimbabwe.

In addition, holders of a valid visa for the United Kingdom, United States, Canada or an EU country do not need a visa for Montserrat.

Other travellers may apply online for an electronic visa, which is valid for 1 year and may be used for multiple entries.

Pitcairn Islands

 – Visitors intending to stay for up to 14 days do not need a visa or prior clearance, and may obtain permission to enter on arrival. Visits longer than 14 days or for employment or business purposes require an entry clearance, whose application should be submitted electronically at least 3 months before travel.

Saint Helena, Ascension and Tristan da Cunha

Different rules apply to each part of the territory of Saint Helena, Ascension and Tristan da Cunha:

 – Visa-free entry is granted to nationals of all European Union countries, Andorra, Antigua and Barbuda, Argentina, Australia, Bahamas, Barbados, Belize, Botswana, Brazil, Brunei, Canada, Chile, Costa Rica, Dominica, East Timor, El Salvador, Grenada, Guatemala, Honduras, Hong Kong, Iceland, Israel, Japan, Kiribati, Liechtenstein, Macau, Malaysia, Maldives, Marshall Islands, Mauritius, Mexico, Micronesia, Monaco, Namibia, Nauru, New Zealand, Nicaragua, Norway, Palau, Panama, Papua New Guinea, Paraguay, Saint Kitts and Nevis, Saint Lucia, Saint Vincent and the Grenadines, Samoa, San Marino, Seychelles, Singapore, Solomon Islands, South Africa, South Korea, Switzerland, Tonga, Trinidad and Tobago, Tuvalu, United Kingdom, United States, Uruguay, Vanuatu, Vatican City and Western Sahara.Nationals of other countries may apply online for an electronic visa.

 – Visitors of all nationalities, including British citizens, need a visa for Ascension Island, except certain government and military personnel, their dependents, and crew members. The Ascension Island government introduced an electronic visa (e-visa) system in the first half of 2018. There are seven e-visa categories: tourist, business, scientific/research, transit, contractor, employment and dependents/family. Tourist e-visas allow a single stay of up to 3 months and are not issued for more than a cumulative duration of 3 months in any 12-month period.From May 2015, the Ascension Island government does not issue visas to nationals of Belarus, China, Egypt, Iran, Libya, North Korea, Russia, Syria, Ukraine and Vietnam, and from 2017, to nationals of Hong Kong, Macau and Taiwan.

 – All visitors must request permission to land in advance from the Secretary of the Administrator. They must also have a return passage, health insurance including medical evacuation, and sufficient funds for their visit.

South Georgia and the South Sandwich Islands 

 – The Commissioner of South Georgia and the South Sandwich Islands, based in Stanley, regulates all access to the territory. All visitors irrespective of their nationality or mode of transport must apply to the Commissioner for permission to land in advance. The visit permit is issued to a 'permit holder', normally a cruise vessel expedition leader or a yacht master. Visitors travelling as paying passengers on cruise ships and yachts do not need to submit a visit application.

Turks and Caicos Islands

 – A visa-free stay of 90 days is granted to nationals of all European Union countries, Antigua and Barbuda, Argentina, Australia, Bahamas, Barbados, Belize, Botswana, Brazil, Canada, Chile, China, Colombia, Costa Rica, Dominica, Ecuador, Fiji, Grenada, Guyana, Hong Kong, Iceland, Israel, Japan, Lesotho, Liechtenstein, Mauritius, Mexico, Monaco, New Zealand, Norway, Oman, Panama, Qatar, Saint Kitts and Nevis, Saint Lucia, Saint Vincent and the Grenadines, Saudi Arabia, Seychelles, Singapore, Solomon Islands, South Africa, South Korea, Suriname, Switzerland, Taiwan, Trinidad and Tobago, Turkey, United Arab Emirates, United Kingdom, United States and Vatican City.

In addition, holders of a valid visa or residence permit for the United Kingdom, United States or Canada do not need a visa for the Turks and Caicos Islands.

Summary of visa exemptions

See also

Visa policy of the United Kingdom
Visa requirements for British Overseas Territories Citizens

Notes

References

BOT
British Overseas Territories
British Overseas Territories